Operation Relex is the name given to the Australian Defence Force (ADF) border protection operation in the country's northern approaches conducted between 2001 and 2006. The operation was instigated following the Tampa affair in September 2001 and the Australian government's resultant Pacific Solution. The focus of Operation Relex was illegal immigration, with assets from all three services of the ADF deployed to prevent the arrival of Suspected Illegal Entry Vessels (SIEVs) in the Australian migration zone.

Operation Relex was folded into the broader border protection activity named Operation Resolute which commenced in July 2006. In 2013, the Abbott Government implemented Operation Sovereign Borders.

Operational Service Medal – Border Protection
The Australian Government issued a medal for service on Border Protection on 22 May 2012.

To qualify, ADF members must have been deployed or force assigned for duty as a member of a declared operation:
 for a period of not less than an aggregate of 30 days; or
 completed 30 sorties from a unit assigned to a declared operation, provided that those sorties were conducted over a period of not less than an aggregate of 30 days at a rate of one sortie per day.

Op Relex
3 September to 13 March 2002

Op Relex II
14 March 2002 to 16 July 2006

HMA Ships Involved in Op Relex
Major Fleet Units

Patrol Boats

References

 
 

2001 in Australia
Relex
Suspected Illegal Entry Vessels